The House at 84 Adalia Avenue is a historic home in the Davis Islands neighborhood of Tampa, Florida, United States. It is located at 84 Adalia Avenue. On August 3, 1989, it was added to the U.S. National Register of Historic Places.

In July 2015, the home was sold for $3.3 million.  It was reported to be in "horrible disrepair" and was removed from the Register.  The new owners will demolish the home and build a new one at the same location.

References and external links

 Hillsborough County listings at National Register of Historic Places

Houses in Tampa, Florida
History of Tampa, Florida
Houses on the National Register of Historic Places in Hillsborough County, Florida
Mediterranean Revival architecture of Davis Islands, Tampa, Florida
1928 establishments in Florida
Houses completed in 1928